An estate sale or estate liquidation is a sale or auction to dispose of a substantial portion of the materials owned by a person who is recently deceased or who must dispose of their personal property to facilitate a move.

Reasons for an estate sale
The most common reasons for an estate sale is the death of the property owner, and the consequent need to quickly liquidate the deceased's belongings for any number of reasons:
The survivors/heirs may have no interest in the bulk of the personal belongings left by the deceased
The survivors/heirs may simply lack space to keep the belongings
The survivors/heirs cannot agree to the disposition of tangible property, and thus a court has ordered the goods to be sold, with the proceeds to be divided among the survivors (after payment of the estate's debts)
The will of the deceased may have mandated a sale of assets, or the assets may have to be sold in order to pay all or part of the estate's debts

An estate sale may also occur because the property owner will be moving or has moved into a new residence where they will be unable to keep their property, such as an assisted living facility, a retirement community, a rest home, or the home of a family member, or in the event of divorce, foreclosure, or relocation.

Conduct
Estate sales are usually conducted by a professional, for a percentage of the revenues. The liquidator may also charge the estate for the costs to give the sale, including advertising, marketing, research, labor, security, refreshments and other fees incurred in giving a successful sale.

Depending on the jurisdiction, estate sales run by professional firms may be required to obtain a permit for the sale (as may also be required to conduct a garage sale) and to collect sales tax on the items sold (or otherwise determine the tax-exempt status of a buyer), and may also be limited as to advertising (for example, on the number and placement of signs along streets).

The presence of a professional liquidator may be necessary because the scope of the process is likely to be overwhelming to the survivors. The liquidator has knowledge and experience with pricing items, and general value knowledge of all types of household goods and personal property value, and the specialist's experience in disposing of unsold goods in an unsentimental manner after the sale. These professionals often take a percentage of the net proceeds, anywhere from 25% to 50%.

Admittance procedure
Since many people may attend, not all people may be able to fit into the confines of the house at the same time.

The crowd thus may be controlled by a numbered sign-up sheet by the door or the issuance of 'numbers.'  Typically the estate sale company will hand out numbered pieces of paper early on the first day to the people waiting in line. This is both a courtesy so that people may wait in their vehicles during inclement weather until the posted start time, and a way to prevent a 'mad rush' for the door when the sale begins. The holder of the sale will then call for the first 10 or 20 numbers. These people are admitted and they get first choice at the items. As they eventually leave, the next numbers are called and admitted. This way the company can control the number of people inside what is typically a cramped house.

Street numbers
Typically one will see in an advertisement of an estate sale, "street numbers honored" or "street numbers not honored."  Street numbers are slips of paper that are generated by customers, usually dealers. These "street" numbers are then exchanged for the real, official numbered slips of paper handed out by the estate sale company.

Liquidators can also choose to not honor any street numbers handed out by customers.  In cases such as this, the liquidator will have wording in their ad such as "street numbers not honored" or "only our numbers honored".  Liquidators will typically do this in order to avoid any customer problems or issues that arise since the street number system is open to abuse.

Sign-up sheet
Another method to control entry to the sale is a sign-up sheet, which can be as simple as a blank piece of paper taped to the front door of the estate.  On this paper, customers write their names on the sheet, and when the sale begins, customers are called in to enter the sale, starting with the first name on the sheet.  Like street numbers, this is also open to abuse.

See also
Estate liquidation
Garage sale

References

External links 

Contexts for auctions
Non-store retailing
Retail formats

fr:Vide-greniers
nl:Vrijmarkt